Fulton is the name of some places in the U.S. state of New York:
Fulton, Oswego County, New York, a city
Fulton, Schoharie County, New York, a town
Fulton County, New York

See also 
Fulton (disambiguation)